BeST Transit (formerly Endless Mountains Transportation Authority) is a public transportation provider that features routes in three northern Pennsylvania counties. It provides bus and paratransit service for Bradford, Sullivan, and Tioga Counties. Four core routes run multiple times per weekday, while a variety of other routes feature two loops per weekday or provide service only on particular days of the week. The Mansfield University of Pennsylvania shuttle is also operated by the agency.

Route list
BeST Transit operates the following routes:

References

Bus transportation in Pennsylvania
Paratransit services in the United States
Transportation in Tioga County, Pennsylvania
Transportation in Bradford County, Pennsylvania
Transportation in Sullivan County, Pennsylvania
Municipal authorities in Pennsylvania
Government of Tioga County, Pennsylvania
Government of Bradford County, Pennsylvania
Government of Sullivan County, Pennsylvania
1985 establishments in Pennsylvania